Psychic... Powerless... Another Man's Sac is the first full-length studio album by American rock band Butthole Surfers, released in December 1984 by Touch and Go Records in America and Fundamental Records in England. All songs were written and produced by the Butthole Surfers.

This was Butthole Surfers' first album on Touch and Go, and was originally released on clear vinyl. It was reissued on Latino Buggerveil in 1999.

The album's back cover and label photos were produced by artist Michael Macioce.

Music
The band embarked on a decidedly more psychedelic direction with their first LP. However, while the album's first half, and in particular "Cherub," have definite psychedelic qualities, elements of traditional punk ("Butthole Surfer"), blues ("Lady Sniff"), surf rock ("Mexican Caravan"), and country rock ("Gary Floyd") are also on display.

Dum Dum is also notable for being another song in Butthole Surfers' catalogue to be based around parts of a Black Sabbath song although the lyrics revolve around an entirely different concept from the original. Specifically, the drums are lifted from Children of the Grave, from the Master of Reality album.

Many of Psychic...'''s tracks were enhanced with extensive tape editing and, in some cases, the addition of non-traditional instrumentation, including the barrage of bizarre sounds (spitting, vomiting, Spanish radio station, etc.) heard in "Lady Sniff." Lead vocalist Gibby Haynes debuted a new vocal technique by singing through a bullhorn for some songs, and played saxophone on "Negro Observer" and "Cowboy Bob". This was the first Butthole Surfers studio album to feature double drummers King Coffey and Teresa Nervosa, and the last with bass player Bill Jolly, who had also performed on the band's first two releases.

Approximately half the songs on this album, including "Negro Observer," "Lady Sniff," "Cherub," "Mexican Caravan," "Cowboy Bob," and "Gary Floyd," are staples of Butthole Surfers' live shows.

Background
According to guitarist Paul Leary, Psychic... was recorded in a very substandard studio. Leary also claims he and Haynes were living in a tool shed at the time of the sessions.

Butthole Surfers weren't under contract to any record label when they recorded this album. Upon its completion they offered it to Alternative Tentacles, who had released the band's first two EPs but could not afford to distribute the new project. This, combined with questions the group had regarding Alternative Tentacles' handling of royalties from Butthole Surfers and Live PCPPEP'', resulted in the album ultimately being released on Touch and Go.

Track listing
All songs written and produced by Butthole Surfers.

Side A

Side B

UK CD bonus tracks
 "Moving to Florida" – 4:32
 "Lou Reed" – 4:57
 "Two Part" – 4:20
 "Tornadoes" – 2:36

Tracks 12–15 from the Cream Corn from the Socket of Davis EP.

Personnel
 Gibby Haynes  – lead vocals, saxophone
 Paul Leary  – guitar, vocals on "Mexican Caravan" and "Gary Floyd"
 Bill Jolly  – bass
 King Coffey  – drums
 Teresa Nervosa  – drums

Charts

References

1984 debut albums
Butthole Surfers albums
Touch and Go Records albums